"Sunday" is the third single by British indie rock band Foals from their fifth studio album, Everything Not Saved Will Be Lost – Part 1. The song was released on 25 February 2019. 

A remix EP of the single was released 27 June 2019 with remixes by British electronic producers, Alex Metric and Lake Turner respectively.

Style 
Ryan Reed, writing for the Rolling Stone described "Sunday" as two songs in one, with the intro having a slow-paced psychedelic and space rock tempo before breaking out into a dance-punk outro." Reed further described the song as "Philippakis gently crooning about burning cities and youthful optimism over swaying electric guitars and ambient keyboard textures.  The arrangement shifts halfway through into a faster, funky section that builds with squelching synths and overlapping vocals." Sam Moore, writing for NME called "Sunday" a "funk-punk" track.

Lyrics 
Philippakis described "Sunday" as a song about the overarching concern of climate change and the apparent inaction by world governments. "Lyrically, there are resonances with what's going on in the world at the moment. I just feel like, what's the utility of being a musician these days, if you can't engage with at least some of this stuff? These songs are white flags, or they're SOSs, or they're cries for help... each in a different way."

Music video
The music video was edited and directed by Leif Podhajsky. The music video features a mirage of storm clouds over a desert with translucent images of Yannis Philippakis since the song in the studio. The music video came out on 2 June 2019.

Track listing

References

External links 
 
 

2019 singles
2019 songs
Foals songs
Transgressive Records singles
Warner Records singles
Songs written by Yannis Philippakis
Environmental songs
Music videos directed by Leif Podhajsky
Songs about climate change